Frederick King or variants may refer to:
 Frederick King (politician), Canadian politician
 Frederick Gilberts King, American mining engineer, pioneer and oilman
 Frederick King (cricketer), English cricketer
 Freddie King, American blues guitarist, singer and songwriter
 Fred King (American football), American football player

See also
 Frederic King, baritone
 Frederic Rhinelander King, American architect
 Fredric King, American film producer and director